The 2003 College Nationals was the 8th Men's College Nationals. The College Nationals was a team handball tournament to determine the College National Champion from 2003 from the US.

Venues 
The championship was played at two venues at the Furman University in Greenville, South Carolina.

Modus 

The 9 teams were divided into two groups.

In the Group stage every group had a round-robin. The best two teams per group qualified for the semifinals.

The fifth placed team of group A played no more games and was ranked 9th.

The third and fourth per group played a 5th - 8th place bracket.

The losers from the semis played a small final and the winners the final.

Results 
Source:

Group stage

Group A

Group B

Championship

Semifinals

Small Final

Final

Placement Games

5th–8th Semifinals

7th place game

5th place game

Final ranking 
Source:

Awards 
Source:

Top scorers 

Source:

All-Tournament Team 
Source:

References

External links 
 Tournament Results archived

USA Team Handball College Nationals by year
Furman Paladins